Waucoba Mountain with an elevation of  is the highest peak in the Inyo Mountains of eastern California. It is in the Inyo Mountains Wilderness and the Inyo National Forest.

"Waucoba" is a name derived from a Native American language meaning "pine trees".

References

External links
 

Inyo Mountains
Mountains of Inyo County, California